Jaroslav Paška (20 June 1954 – 15 July 2021) was a Slovak politician. A member of the Slovak National Party (SNS), he served in the National Council of Slovakia from 1994 to 2002, 2006 to 2009, and 2016 to 2020. He also served in the European Parliament from 2009 to 2014, during which he was a member of Europe of Freedom and Direct Democracy. Prior to serving in politics, he had a career as an architect and spoke French and Russian. He had begun serving as Vice-President of the SNS in 1999.

References

1954 births
2021 deaths
20th-century Slovak politicians
21st-century Slovak politicians
Slovak National Party politicians
Government ministers of Slovakia
Members of the Parliamentary Assembly of the Council of Europe
MEPs for Slovakia 2009–2014
Members of the National Council (Slovakia) 1994-1998
Members of the National Council (Slovakia) 1998-2002
Members of the National Council (Slovakia) 2006-2010
Members of the National Council (Slovakia) 2016-2020
People from Banská Štiavnica